Truro City Football Club is an English football club based in Truro, Cornwall. They currently play in the Southern League, at the seventh tier of the English football league system. They are the highest ranked club from Cornwall. 
The club had previously played in what was known as the Conference South in 2011, following five promotions in six seasons. They were relegated at the end of the 2012–13 season after going into administration, but returned to that level, now known as the National League South, in 2015, before being relegated back to the Southern League in 2019.

They were founding members of the South Western League in 1951 and won the title five times in their history. Apart from a three-season spell in the 1970s, when they played in the Cornwall Combination after losing their ground as part of a by-pass development, they remained in the South Western League until 2006, when they joined the Western Football League, achieving promotion from Division One to the Premier Division in their first season.

Truro were FA Cup regulars throughout the 1950s, but subsequently they were sporadic entrants until a permanent return to the competition in the 2006–07 season, their first appearance in 13 years, then in 2017 they reached the first round for the first time in their history losing away to Charlton Athletic. They won the FA Vase in 2006–07.

History
In 1889 Truro City became one of the founding members of the Cornwall County Football Association (CCFA).  Later in 1889, they played their first game at Truro School against Penzance, winning 7–1.  They then switched to Tolgarrick for their future games.  Six years later in 1895, they won their first, the Cornwall Senior Cup, beating Launceston 5–0.

In the 1930s Truro left Cornish football for a time, joining the Plymouth and District League, which they went on to win in 1936–37. However, as a result of this switch, they were barred from competing the Cornwall Senior Cup, although they were re-admitted again in 1938.

They were founding members of the South Western League in 1951, but stumbled in the initial years, requiring re-election in both of their first two seasons to remain in the league. However, they won the championship five times since, and were only out of the division for three seasons when they lost their ground due to road widening.

The 2000s

Wembley triumph
In the 2005–06 season, they finished runners-up in the South Western League and were promoted to the Western League Division One, becoming champions at the first attempt.  They also won the 2006–07 FA Vase, beating AFC Totton 3–1 in the final, held at the new Wembley Stadium in front of an FA Vase record crowd of 36,232 fans, becoming the first Cornish football club to win a national trophy.

Promotion to the Southern League
In their first season in the Western League Premier Division, Truro gained promotion to the Southern League at the first attempt, and became the first Cornish side ever to play in the Southern League, only three promotions from the Football League. They were faced with the longest travelling mileage of any club at their level due to the prevalence of Wiltshire-based clubs in the Western League.

Towards the end of the 2007–08 season, after the club's promotion to the Southern League was earned, chairman Kevin Heaney issued a statement reversing an earlier decision to turn the club fully professional for the following season, which led to the resignation of boss Dave Leonard. For the remainder of the season, Director of Football Chris Webb took charge, assisted by former boss Dave Newton.

Heaney owned a housing company and despite a slump in the housing market, the club were able to attract many players on higher wages from higher leagues. Heaney had stated he believed that long term, due to the large population catchment area, that Truro City could support a Football League Two club, but he also stated that he was looking to sell the club before they achieve this level. Despite his housing company having gone into liquidation owing £4.5m, he categorically denied claims that his money was drying up and said that he would continue to fund the club's success.

In May 2008 former Plymouth Argyle and Exeter City striker Sean McCarthy was appointed the new Truro manager and the club appointed Dave Newton as his assistant. On 7 December 2009 Sean McCarthy left the club by mutual consent following a 7–2 away defeat to Stourbridge. On 22 December 2009 Truro signed Mangotsfield United midfielder Kyle Tooze, for an undisclosed fee, thought to be in the region of £5,000. On 29 December 2009 Steven Thompson was announced as the new manager with immediate effect, but on 29 March 2010 he left the club by mutual consent after only winning five out of his 18 games in charge, with the chance of reaching the play-offs unrealistic.

The 2010s

Promotion to the sixth tier
Lee Hodges was appointed as Thompson's replacement, and had a successful first season in charge as on 23 April 2011, Truro were promoted as champions of the Southern League to the Conference South for the 2011–12 season with one league game remaining after a 3–0 win at Banbury United.

In 2011–12, Truro finished in a respectable 14th place in their first ever season in the Conference South, but financial troubles were to follow.

Financial trouble
On 25 August 2011, HM Revenue and Customs presented a winding-up petition to the club due to unpaid taxes of over £100,000. Prior to this, chairman Kevin Heaney had to quell rumours of the club being sold. A meeting on 31 October 2011 between the club and HMRC resulted in a postponement of the winding-up process to allow the club until 16 January 2012 to pay their taxes. When the case was called, the Registrar was told that two hours before the hearing the tax debt had been "paid in full." A further winding-up petition was lodged by HMRC in the High Court of Justice (Chancery Division) on 30 March 2012, with a hearing on 30 April 2012 when the club was expected to pay £51,000 to HM Revenue and Customs. When this was not paid, a further extension to 25 June 2012 was granted, but the petition was dismissed when the bill was ultimately settled. Four other parties were also claiming monies amounting to around £700,000, but the club disputed these claims.

Chairman Kevin Heaney stepped down on 24 August 2012 after being declared bankrupt, and he was replaced by vice-chairman Chris Webb. On 31 August, Truro City F.C. filed for administration after the first-team players, who had not been paid during August, informed the club that they would not play against Boreham Wood on 1 September unless this course of action was taken. On 3 September, a further HMRC winding-up order over a tax bill of £15,000 was postponed until 17 September, but this order would be dismissed if the club went into administration, which it did the following day. Ten points were deducted from Truro's total, leaving them bottom of the Conference South table.

On 11 October 2012, Truro City's administrators failed to meet the deadline for the Football Conference's requirement of a £50,000 bond that would enable the club to continue in the Conference South. This bond was to cover the costs of visiting clubs should Truro be liquidated during the season and their results be expunged from the record. A reduced amount was offered by the club, and was refused by the Conference. The match at home to Dover Athletic on 13 October was called off, and the club was expected to be expelled from the league with liquidation probably following such an expulsion.

However, on 12 October the Conference gave the club another week to pay the bond, in the light of "encouraging" information from the administrator. After a preferred bidder pulled out on the morning of 19 October, the bond remained unpaid and the club was set to be expelled from the Football Conference, but discussions continued and City were reprieved later the same day when two businessmen, Pete Masters and Philip Perryman, paid the £50,000 bond. The pair completed a deal to purchase the club on 14 December 2012.

The new ownership were unable to prevent relegation from the Conference South, and Lee Hodges was not offered a new contract at the end of the season as the club were still unable to afford his wages. On 5 June 2013, a CVA was agreed with the club's creditors, reducing the debt to £80,000 to be paid over three years. This agreement allowed City to begin the 2013–14 season in the Premier Division of the Southern League.

Post-administration
Hodges was replaced in June 2013 by Steve Massey, returning for his third spell as manager, having been in the post previously between 1992–94 and 2005–06. Massey was sacked on 12 March 2014 with City struggling in 19th place in the Southern League. The following day, Steve Tully was appointed player-manager until the end of the season.

Tully earned the job on a permanent basis, and under his guidance Truro were promoted back to the Conference South, renamed the National League South, after winning the 2014–15 Southern Football League play-off final 1–0 at home to St Neots Town on 4 May 2015.

The 2015–16 season in the National League South would be just the second time Truro had played at that level, where they finished 4th and reached the playoffs, losing to Maidstone United in the semi-finals. The 2016–17 season saw the club do less well, finishing 19th, just one place above the relegation zone. Steve Tully was relieved of his managerial duties and replaced by Lee Hodges, who had only left the club three years prior.

In 2017–18, the club bounced back and finished 7th, which again qualified them for the play-offs, in which they lost 3–1 to Hampton & Richmond Borough in the qualifying-round. That season also saw the club go on an FA Cup run, making the first round proper, where they were beaten 3–1 by Charlton Athletic at The Valley, Tyler Harvey being the Truro goalscorer.

The club's lack of consistency was prominent again in the 2018–19 season, where after just two games long-serving manager Lee Hodges resigned. The club poached Taunton Town manager Leigh Robinson and his assistant Michael Meaker, but they were both sacked in March 2019, with the club 19th in the league. Paul Wilkinson was named caretaker-manager but couldn't save the club, who eventually finished 20th and were relegated to the Southern League. Wilkinson left the club to become manager of EFL League One side Bury, and was replaced by Paul Wotton ahead of the 2019–20 season.

Crest and colours

Crest evolution

Stadium

Truro City traditionally played their home games at Treyew Road, Truro, TR1 2TH. The ground had been their home since the mid-1900s. A covered terrace was in place behind one of the goals until the mid-1970s when a road widening scheme resulted in it being removed. Only in recent years have they added to their old stand and erected two new stands on opposite sides of the ground lifting the capacity to approximately 3,000.

In 2005 the club announced plans to build a new 16,000-seater stadium in Truro as a new home for the city's football club. However, the £12m plans were opposed by some residents who live near the proposed site at Treyew Road. In 2006, the club revealed plans for a £7m football training complex. The club wanted to build two new pitches and a club house on land in Kenwyn, Truro with a 60-bed hotel and offices at its present Treyew Road base. However, in 2007, Carrick District Council rejected the plans for the new 16,000-seater stadium, a decision which club chairman Kevin Heaney described as a 'major blow'.

In 2011 Cornwall Council started developing a business plan for the proposed Stadium for Cornwall, which would host both Truro City and the Cornish Pirates rugby union team.

In 2014, the club sold Treyew Road for redevelopment, with the intention of using the money as their share of the development costs for the planned new stadium. The club received three extensions allowing them to stay at the ground following its sale, but in the summer of 2018, the development company announced its plans to begin work on the project immediately, forcing Truro City to find a temporary location. Eventually, the club came to an agreement with divisional rivals Torquay United to undertake a groundshare of their Plainmoor stadium, a ground that was 2 hours away from Truro. This agreement created the quirk of having more than 2,700 away fans than home ones in attendance when Truro hosted Torquay that season.

In October 2018 it was revealed that the deal with Helical Retail, who were going to redevelop the Treyew Road site into a supermarket, was off. In January 2019, Truro returned to Treyew Road, but insisted that their return to the ground did not affect their plans to share the proposed Stadium for Cornwall with rugby union club Cornish Pirates in future. The Pirates bought Truro in March 2019.

In January 2021 it was announced that the club will finally leave their Treyew Road ground and groundshare with Plymouth Parkway F.C. at Bolitho Park, Plymouth, until 2022 when the Stadium for Cornwall is scheduled to be finished.

Truro City published a Club Statement on their website stating they will be playing a second season at Plymouth Parkway due to Stadium for Cornwall not yet being built.

Players

Current squad

Former players

Club staff

First-team coaches

Board members

Achievements
FA Vase
Winners: (1): 2006–07
Southern League Premier Division
Winners (1): 2010–11
Play-off winners: (1): 2014–15
Southern Football League Division One South & West
 Winners: (1): 2008–09
 Western League Premier Division:
Winners: (1): 2007–08
 Western League Division One:
Winners: (1): 2006–07
 South Western League:
Winners (5): 1960–61, 1969–70, 1992–93, 1995–96, 1997–98
Runners-up (7): 1954–55, 1962–63, 1966–67, 1967–68, 1970–71, 1996–97, 2005–06
 South Western League Cup:
Winners (3): 1959–60, 1966–67 (joint), 1992–93
Runners-up (6): 1954–55, 1958–59, 1967–68, 1993–94, 1996–97, 1997–98
 Cornwall Senior Cup:
Winners (15): 1894–95, 1901–02, 1902–03, 1910–11, 1923–24, 1926–27, 1927–28, 1937–38, 1958–59, 1966–67, 1969–70, 1994–95, 1997–98, 2005–06, 2006–07, 2007–08
 Durning Lawrence Cornwall Charity Cup:
Winners (11): 1911–12, 1912–13, 1919–20, 1925–26, 1928–29, 1929–30, 1930–31, 1932–33, 1949–50, 1964–65, 1980–81
Runners-up (9): 1905–06, 1909–10, 1910–11, 1913–14, 1924–25, 1937–38, 1957–58, 1966–67, 2002–03
Rathbone U18's Cup:
Winners 2021-22
Semi-Finalist 2022-23 - Beaten 1-0 by 'The Mighty' Helston Athletic FC

Records
 Best FA Cup performance: First Round (2017–18)
 Best FA Trophy performance: Third Round (2020–21, 2021-22)
 Best FA Vase performance: Winners (2006–07)
 Highest league position: 4th, National League South (2015–16)
 Most League goals in a season (by team): 185 (2006–07, Western Football League Division One, 42 games)
 Most League points in a season: 115 (2006–07, Western Football League Division One, 42 games)

References

External links

Official website

 
National League (English football) clubs
Football clubs in Cornwall
Football clubs in England
Western Football League
Southern Football League clubs
Truro
Association football clubs established in 1889
1889 establishments in England
South Western Football League